Reuben Hollebon is a British singer-songwriter from Norfolk, England.  He signed to Bright Antenna Records in 2014 and released his debut album, Terminal Nostalgia on 20 May 2016. Before recording his album, he worked as a recording engineer and producer, helping to produce works for Nitin Sawhney, Paul McCartney, Courtney Barnett, and the London Symphony Orchestra.

Band members
Reuben Hollebon (Vocals, Acoustic Guitar, Contra Bass, Drums, Electric Guitar, Hammond Organ, Harmonium, Percussion, Piano, Rhodes)
Jacob Hollebon (Bass)
Tom Bazeley (Trombone, Keys)
Jacob Wheeler (Drums)

Discography

Studio albums
 Clutch (Akira Records, Dec 10, 2012)
Terminal Nostalgia (Bright Antenna, May 20, 2016)

References

External links
Official website

Year of birth missing (living people)
Living people
British male singer-songwriters
Bright Antenna Records artists